Eric Gordon Corley (born December 16, 1959), also frequently referred to by his pen name of Emmanuel Goldstein, is a figure in the hacker community. He directs the non-profit organization 2600 Enterprises, Inc., publishes a magazine called 2600: The Hacker Quarterly (which has associated monthly meet-ups around the world), and hosts the hacker convention Hackers on Planet Earth (HOPE). His pseudonym is derived from the fictional opposition leader in George Orwell's dystopian novel Nineteen Eighty-Four.

In 1993, Corley testified before the United States House of Representatives Subcommittee on Telecommunications. Corley was questioned in relation to the content of 2600 as part of discussions concerning the Digital Telephony Bill; also known as the Communications Assistance for Law Enforcement Act.

Corley is the editor of The Best of 2600: A Hacker Odyssey which was released July 2008. The book consists of articles from the magazine 2600: The Hacker Quarterly set in chronological order to show the evolution of the internet and technology. A follow-up book, Dear Hacker. Letters to the Editor of 2600, was published in 2010.

Corley is the host of both the weekly radio programs Off the Hook on WBAI-FM and Off the Wall on WUSB-FM. While Off the Hook often includes a panel of guests and is frequently centered on technological topics, Off the Wall is usually narrated by Eric Corley himself and has covered a wide range of topics. Off the Hook has been on the air since 1988.

Corley directed the 2001 film Freedom Downtime, a documentary about the incarcerations of Kevin Mitnick and Bernie S that also examines alleged distortions in mainstream media coverage of Mitnick's case.

References

Further reading
 United States District Court Southern District of New York (2000). Decision in UNIVERSAL CITY STUDIOS, INC, et al. v. SHAWN C. REIMERDES, et al. (PDF from MPAA) p. 12–13
 2600 Website (2004) Off The Wall. Retrieved June 16, 2005.
 CNN .
 
 The Best of 2600 
 Dear Hacker. Letters to the Editor of 2600

External links
 2600 Magazine
 RNC '04 Ordeal
 
 emmangoldstein on Twitter
 Corley: "WikiLeaks is Not One Person, We Are All the Threat" – video interview by Democracy Now!

Living people
2600: The Hacker Quarterly
American magazine editors
American magazine publishers (people)
Stony Brook University alumni
Ward Melville High School alumni
Chief executives of computer security organizations
American talk radio hosts
1959 births
American documentary film directors